"Everything Is Beautiful" is a song written, composed, and performed by Ray Stevens. It has appeared on many of Stevens's albums, including one named after the song, and has become a pop standard and common in religious performances. The children heard singing the chorus of the song, using the hymn, "Jesus Loves the Little Children", are from the Oak Hill Elementary School in Nashville, Tennessee. This group includes Stevens's two daughters.
The song was responsible for two wins at the Grammy Awards of 1971: Grammy Award for Best Male Pop Vocal Performance for Ray Stevens and Grammy Award for Best Inspirational Performance for Jake Hess. Stevens's recording was the Number 1 song on the Billboard Hot 100 for two weeks in the summer of 1970. The song also spent three weeks atop the adult contemporary chart. Many country stations played the song, with it peaking at number 39 on Billboards chart. Billboard ranked the record as the No. 12 song of 1970. The song includes anti-racist and pro-tolerance lyrics such as "We shouldn't care 'bout the length of his hair/Or the color of his skin."

This song was a major departure for Stevens, as "Everything Is Beautiful" is a more serious and spiritual tune, unlike some of his earlier ("Gitarzan" and "Ahab the Arab") and later ("The Streak") recordings, which were comedy/novelty songs. While Stevens would continue to perform novelty songs throughout his career, the success of "Everything Is Beautiful" would allow Stevens to record more serious material throughout the 1970s.

Charts

Weekly charts

Year-end charts

Jody Wayne cover
South African singer Jody Wayne covered "Everything is Beautiful" in early 1972. His version reached number 20 in his home nation.

Other cover versions
Jim Nabors covered the song in 1970, for his vinyl album of the same name. Reaching #124 on the Billboard Hot 200 chart.
 Bing Crosby recorded the song for his 1972 album Bing 'n' Basie.
 Neil Sedaka performed a version of this selection on his 1976 album Live in Australia.
 Dana named her 1980 album after that song. It made #43 in the UK chart. In 1986 her single reached #42 in Ireland.
 Foster & Allen recorded a version of the song for their album Songs We Love to Sing (1994) which reached number 41 on the UK Albums Chart that year and number 66 on the Irish albums chart.
 Cledus T. Judd also did a version for the album Boogity, Boogity – A Tribute to the Comedic Genius of Ray Stevens. It featured Michael English, Wynonna Judd, Trace Adkins, Rascal Flatts, Dobie Gray, Erika Jo, and SHeDAISY as accompanying vocalists.
In 2005, American Idol season 4, top-ten finalists covered this song during the top 10 results show.
Stevens re-recorded the song in 2020. This "50th Anniversary" re-recording includes a spoken prologue and epilogue noting how much progress had been made since 1970, while calling out those who use diversity to divide society and beseeching Americans not to fall apart.

References

External links
 

1970 singles
Ray Stevens songs
Billboard Hot 100 number-one singles
Cashbox number-one singles
Number-one singles in Australia
RPM Top Singles number-one singles
Grammy Award for Best Male Pop Vocal Performance
Songs against racism and xenophobia
Songs written by Ray Stevens
1970 songs